Platinum-195 nuclear magnetic resonance spectroscopy (platinum NMR or 195Pt NMR) is a spectroscopic technique which is used for the detection and characterisation of platinum compounds. The sensitivity of the technique and therefore its diagnostic utility have increased significantly starting from the 1970s, with 195Pt NMR nowadays considered the method of choice for structural elucidation of Pt species in solution.

Examples of compounds routinely characterised with the method include platinum clusters and organoplatinum species such as PtII-based antitumour agents. Additional applications of 195Pt NMR include kinetic and mechanistic studies or investigations on drug binding.

195Pt magnetic properties 
Among the naturally occurring isotopes of platinum, 195Pt is the most abundant (33.8%) and the only one with non-zero spin I=1/2. The magnetic properties of the nucleus are considered favourable; the high natural abundance coupled with a medium gyromagnetic ratio (5.768×107 rad T−1 s−1) result in good 195Pt NMR signal receptivity, 19 times that of 13C (but still only 0.0034 times that of 1H).

The resonance frequency (relative to a 100 MHz 1H NMR instrument) is approximately 21.4 MHz, close to the 13C resonance at 25.1 MHz.

Chemical shifts 
The chemical shifts of 195Pt nuclei span a very large range of over 13000 ppm (cf. with ~300 ppm range for 13C). The NMR signals are also very sharp and highly sensitive to the platinum chemical environment (oxidation state, ligand identity and field strength, coordination number, etc.). Therefore, substituting even very similar ligands can result in shift changes in the order of hundreds of ppm which stand out on the spectrum and are easily monitored.

The reference compound typically chosen for 195Pt NMR experiments is 1.2 M sodium hexachloroplatinate(IV) (Na2PtCl6) in D2O; this platinum(IV) complex is preferred due to its commercial availability, chemical stability, lower price relative to other platinum compounds, and high solubility which enables spectrum recording within minutes. Less soluble ionic platinum complexes have spectrum recording times of about an hour, whereas the borderline insoluble neutral complexes may require overnight measurements.

The high sensitivity of the experiment means that contributions from different chlorine isotopes in the reference compound or other species can be resolved at high magnetic field strengths, giving a ±5 ppm uncertainty in reported shift values (which is, however, negligible in view of the 13000 ppm overall range).

Couplings 

Coupling of 195Pt to 1H, 13C, 31P, 19F or 15N has been reported through one up to four bonds (1J to 4J) and is commonly studied to provide additional structural information for platinum complexes. The ~34% abundance of 195Pt (with the remaining 66% of natural Pt being NMR-inactive) means that this coupling appears in the respective 1H/31P/15N/13C NMR spectra as satellite peaks (cf. 13C satellites) which, for example, result in 17:66:17 patterns for singlets.

The trans influence in 16 e− square planar PtII complexes has been studied by comparing the magnitude of coupling constants in the cis- and trans- isomers.

Complicated homonuclear couplings ranging from 60 to 9000 Hz for 1J(195Pt–195Pt) are of interest in the context of platinum cluster compounds.

References 

Nuclear magnetic resonance
Platinum